Anna Karlsson (born 12 May 1975) is a Swedish sprint canoeist who has competed since the late 1990s. She won four medals at the ICF Canoe Sprint World Championships with a silver (K-4 200 m: 1998) and three bronzes (K-2 1000 m: 1998, K-4 200 m: 1997, 2006).

Karlsson also finished eighth in the K-2 500 m event at the 2004 Summer Olympics in Athens.

References

Sports-reference.com profile

1975 births
Canoeists at the 2004 Summer Olympics
Living people
Olympic canoeists of Sweden
Swedish female canoeists
ICF Canoe Sprint World Championships medalists in kayak